Sajjad Ashouri is an Iranian striker  who currently plays for Zob Ahan in Persian Gulf Pro League.

Career

Persepolis
He signed a three-years contract with Persepolis on 11 July 2013.

Club Career Statistics

References

Living people
Paykan F.C. players
Iranian footballers
1992 births
Association football forwards
People from Qaem Shahr
Mes Rafsanjan players
Khooneh be Khooneh players
Nassaji Mazandaran players
Sportspeople from Mazandaran province